Pranayam ( "Love") is a 2015 Indian Malayalam-language television series that was broadcast on Asianet channel. Srinish Aravind and Varada played the lead roles.

It was the remake of Yeh Hai Mohabbatein aired on StarPlus. It shows the love of two different states and two different culture.  The pair was known as #SharMi on social networking sites. After Varada quit the show citing health issues, ratings tanked and the show was cancelled.

Plot 
Following a divorce from his unfaithful wife Kavitha, after her affair with his boss Prakash, Sharan Menon is a bitter man, but he loves his daughter, Malavika "Malu" Sharan. Lekshmi Iyer, who lives next door, also loves Malu. Unable to have children of her own, she has been unable to find a partner willing to marry an infertile woman. Kavitha and Prakash win custody of Manu, Sharan's elder son and also try to take custody of Malu from Sharan. Lekshmi and Sharan put aside their dislike of each other to marry to protect the little girl and ultimately win custody of the child. Prakash tries to take revenge, convincing Sharan that Malu is not his daughter until Lekshmi realizes what's going on and uses a DNA test to resolve Sharan's doubts.

After this, Lekshmi became the target of sexual predator Indugopan, who is the husband of Sharan's younger sister Simi. Indugopan convinces Simi that it is Lekshmi who is attracted to him, sowing discord in the family and causing Lekshmi's family to take her away. Realizing that Lekshmi is innocent, Sharan successfully plots to place Indugopan in jail for his crimes, while Prakash and Simi seek to do what they can to free him.

Meanwhile, Sharan's colleague and good friend Anand is preparing to marry after a family feud broke up his relationship with Lekshmi's cousin Ashwathy. Their friends plot to get the couple back together. A drama takes place and Anand is engaged to Ashwathy. Saraswathi, Lekshmi's mom, meets with an accident caused by Manu unknowingly. Sharan finds out that it was Manu who was responsible for the accident. Kavitha is ready to take the blame on her to protect her son. Sharan begins to support Kavitha which hurts Lekshmi a lot. She files a case against Kavitha. In the court, Sharan takes Kavitha's side. However, Lekshmi learns that Manu has done the accident and apologizes to Sharan. Sharan gives punishment to Manu by sending him to a boys' rehab centre.

Sharan plans a picnic for Lekshmi. Unfortunately Lekshmi fractures her hand and Sharan takes care of Lekshmi. Sachin, Prakash's brother, come to meet Lekshmi. Sharan fights with him as he behaves rudely with Lekshmi. Anand and Ashwathy plan to get married. However, in the register office, Anand's sister has given a letter, opposing the marriage. Everyone is puzzled as Anand has always said that he is an orphan. Ashwathy questions Sharan about the whereabouts of Anand's sister. Lekshmi secretly finds out find out Anand's sister and plans to reveal it to everyone during his marriage function. However, during the function, a big drama takes place and Anand is forced to confess that his sister is none other than Kavitha. It later turns out that it was all an elaborate plan made by Kavitha. She wanted him to acknowledge her as his sister, as he had cut all relations with her after she had betrayed Sharan and gone with Prakash.

Kavitha wanted to marry Prakash and Lekshmi's sister Aswathy wanted to marry Kavitha's brother Anand. Prakash tries to brainwash Aswathy. Kavitha and Prakash's marriage is called off. Prakash blackmails Aswathy and Aswathy marries him to save Anand. Soon Sharan's son Manu along with Kavitha also comes to them and lives with them. Kavitha tries to create troubles in Lekshmi and Sharan's love using Manu but she fail and leaves the house. Kavitha still attempts to hamper the peace of Menon family.

Cast 
Srinish Aravind  as Sharan G Menon 
 Varada / Divya Nair as Lekshmi Viswanatha Iyer a.k.a. Lekshmi Sharan G Menon
Naveen Arakkal as Prakash Varama, Kavitha's ex-partner 
Baby Sradha / Baby Megha Mahesh as Malavika (Malu), Sharan and Kavitha's daughter; Lakshmi's stepdaughter
Master Siddharth as Manu, Sharan and Kavitha's son; Lakshmi's stepson
Maneesh Krishna as Anand, Sharan's brotherly best friend; Kavitha's brother
Althara as Kavitha, Manu's mother; Sharan's ex-wife; Prakash's ex-partner
Kottayam Rasheed as Govinda Menon, Sharan's father
Beena Antony as Madhavi Govinda Menon, Sharan's mother
Pratheeksha G Pradeep as Aswathy Iyer, Prakash's wife; Anand's ex-fiancé; Lekshmi's and Devika's cousin
Adithyan Jayan as Balachandran (Balu), Devika's husband
Jishin Mohan as Sachin Varma, Prakash's brother 
Rishi as Indu Gopan, Simi's husband
Amrutha as Simi, Sharan's sister
Adarsh / Vishnu V Nair as Karthik, Saran's brother
Kailas Nath as Viswanatha Iyer, Lekshmi's father
Anuradha Krishnamoorthy as Saraswathy Viswantha Iyer, Lekshmi's mother
Arya Sreeram as Devika Balachandran, Lekshmi's sister
Sabari Nath as ACP Sankar IPS
Vandana as Shaarika, Karthik's love interest
 Aiswarya as Anand's wife
 Sini Varghese as Tanuja, Prakash's friend 
 Karthika Kannan as Radhika
Faizal Razi as Dr.Manoj
Fawaz Zayani as Mani / Abhimanyu Raghav, Lekshmi's childhood friend; Sharan's business partner
Vanchiyoor Praveen Kumar as Ammavan

Awards and nominations

References 

2015 Indian television series debuts
Malayalam-language television shows
Asianet (TV channel) original programming